John Ryan VC (1823 – 4 March 1858) was an Irish recipient of the Victoria Cross, the highest and most prestigious award for gallantry in the face of the enemy that can be awarded to British and Commonwealth forces.

Details
He was about 34 years old, and a private in the 1st Madras Fusiliers (later The Royal Dublin Fusiliers), Madras Army during the Indian Mutiny when the following deed took place at the Relief of Lucknow for which he (and Peter McManus) were awarded the VC:

He later achieved the rank of Sergeant and was killed in action at Cawnpore, India, on 4 March 1858.

The medal
His Victoria Cross is held by the National Army Museum, Chelsea, London.

References

Listed in order of publication year 
The Register of the Victoria Cross (1981, 1988 and 1997)

Ireland's VCs  (Dept of Economic Development 1995)
Monuments to Courage (David Harvey, 1999)
Irish Winners of the Victoria Cross (Richard Doherty & David Truesdale, 2000)

1823 births
1858 deaths
19th-century Irish people
Irish soldiers in the British East India Company Army
People from Kilkenny (city)
People from Kanpur
Irish recipients of the Victoria Cross
Indian Rebellion of 1857 recipients of the Victoria Cross
British military personnel killed in the Indian Rebellion of 1857
Military personnel from County Kilkenny